Angkatan Wanita Sedar (AWAS; Conscious Women's Front) was the first nationalist women's organisation in Malaysia. It was established in late 1945 as women's wing of the Malay Nationalist Party (PKMM). Aishah Ghani was the first president of AWAS. The organisation was also led by Shamsiah Fakeh. At its peak, AWAS had a membership of 2000 women. The group organised, held discussions and hosted Indonesian women visitors. AWAS members, led by Sakinah Junid, participated in a six-mile protest march against the British prohibition disallowing the use of motorised vehicles in processions.

Anthropologist Wazir Jahan Karim attributes the impetus for the creation of AWAS to the core leaders of the organisation: Aishah Ghani, Sakinah Junid and Shamsiah Fakeh.

On 22 February 1947, AWAS joined the People's Action Centre (PRINCE), a coalition of six left-wing political parties led by Ishak Haji Muhammad (Pak Sako). Following the defeat of Japan, the British Military Administration resumed control of Malaya and banned AWAS in 1948 together with several other political parties like PKMM and Hisbul Muslimin, accusing for having connection with Malayan Communist Party.

References

History of Malaysia
Women in Malaysia
Organizations established in 1945
Organizations disestablished in 1948
1945 establishments in British Malaya
1948 disestablishments in Malaya
Women's wings of political parties